Tulem may refer to:
 Tulem District
 Tulem Rural District